Mikiya (written: 幹也, 幹弥 or 三起也) is a masculine Japanese given name. Notable people with the name include:

, Japanese footballer
, Japanese composer and member of Ali Project
, Japanese footballer

Japanese masculine given names